The following is a list of paramilitary organisations.

Governmental paramilitary units

Africa

Kenya
 General Service Unit (Kenya)
 Kenya Wildlife Service (KWS)

Libya (Libyan House of Representatives)
 Avengers of Blood

Mauritius 
 Special Mobile Force

Nigeria
 Federal Road Safety Corps (FRSC)
 Nigeria Security and Civil Defence Corps
 Discipline and Intelligence Corps
 Safety and Traffic Cadet Corps

Seychelles
 Seychelles People's Defence Forces

Sudan
 Rapid Support Forces

Americas

Canada 
 The Emergency Response Team (RCMP)
 Marine Emergency  Response Team

United States 
 CIA Special Activities Center, Special Operations Group
 DOE Federal Protective Forces
 DOE Office of Secure Transportation
 FBI SWAT
 FBI Hostage Rescue Team
 United States Marshals Service

Venezuela 
 Venezuelan National Guard
 Bolivarian Militia of Venezuela

Asia

Bangladesh 
 Border Guard Bangladesh
 Bangladesh Coast Guard
 Bangladesh Ansar
 Bangladesh National Cadet Corps

China 
 Paramilitary forces of China

Hong Kong 
 Police Force
Special Duties Unit
Special Tactical Squad
Counter Terrorism Response Unit
Police Tactical Unit
Airport Security Unit
VIP Protection Unit
 Surveillance Support Unit
Quick Reaction Force
Small Boat Division
 Maritime Emergency Response Team
Civil Aid Service
Government Flying Service

India 
 Paramilitary forces of India

Indonesia 
 Brimob
 Densus 88

Japan 
 Special Assault Team

Malaysia 
 Pasukan Gerakan Am as Paramilitary Force
 People's Volunteer Corps of Ministry of Home Affairs
 69 Komando PGK as Multi Spectrum Special Force

North Korea 
The Worker-Peasant Red Guards of the Workers' Party of Korea of North Korea

Pakistan 
 Civil Armed Forces
 Pakistan National Guard
 Pakistan Levies

Philippines 
Special Action Force

Sri Lanka 
 Special Task Force

Thailand 
Border Patrol Police
Marine Paramilitary Task Force
Paramilitary Marine Regiment, Royal Thai Navy also known as Thahan Phran Marines
Thahan Phran also known as Thai Rangers
Village Scouts
Volunteer Defense Corps (Thailand)

Vietnam
 Militia and Self-Defense (Vietnam)

Europe

Albania 
 RENEA

Estonia 
 Estonian Defence League

Finland 
 Border Guard
 Police Rapid Response Unit

France 
 Action Division of DGSE
 National Gendarmerie
 Marseille Naval Fire Battalion of the French Navy
 Paris Fire Brigade of the French Army

Italy 
 Guardia di Finanza

Latvia 
 Zemessardze

Lithuania 
 Lithuanian Riflemen's Union

Netherlands 
 Royal Marechaussee
 Dienst Speciale Interventies

Poland
 BOA KGP

Portugal

 Guarda Nacional Republicana (National Republican Guard)

Russia 
 Registered Cossacks of the Russian Federation
 Kadyrovtsy

Sweden 
 National Task Force

Ukraine 
 Azov Battalion
 Noman Çelebicihan Battalion
 Ukrainian Volunteer Corps (since 2022)

Middle East

Iran 
 Islamic Revolutionary Guard Corps
 Basij

Iraq 
 Popular Mobilization Forces
 Facilities Protection Service

Israel 
 Magav

Syria 
 National Defence Forces

Turkey 
 Village Guards

Oceania

Australia 
 Australian Border Force

Non-governmental paramilitary units

Africa

Somalia 
Raskamboni Front

Americas

Colombia 
AUC
AAA
CONVIVIR
Peasant Self-Defense Forces of Córdoba and Urabá (ACCU)
Los Paisas
Black Eagles
Los Rastrojos
Libertadores del Vichada
Bloque Meta
ERPAC

See also Right-wing paramilitarism in Colombia.

Mexico 
Jalisco New Generation Cartel
Grupos de autodefensa comunitaria

United States 
Various unorganized non-governmental Militia organizations in the United States (that are not associated with the U.S. military, law enforcement agencies, nor state defense forces in any way). There are many others totaling at around 334 unorganized militia groups as of  2011
3 Percenters
Arizona Border Recon
Hutaree
Idaho Light Foot Militia
Michigan Militia
Militia of Montana
Missouri Citizens Militia
New York Light Foot Militia
Oath Keepers
Ohio Defense Force 
Texas Light Foot Militia
Fruit of Islam, paramilitary wing of the Nation of Islam

Asia

Cambodia 
Cambodian Freedom Fighters (CFF) (Cholana Kangtoap Serei Cheat Kampouchea): Rebel group in Cambodia

India 
Rashtriya Swayamsevak Sangh
Popular Front of India

Indonesia 
Pancasila Youth
Free Aceh Movement: Regional separatist group in Aceh, Indonesia. Also known as Aceh Security Disturbance Movement.

Malaysia 
 Barasi Revolusi Nasional (BRN): National separatist group in Malaysia and Thailand
 Barisan National Pember-Basan Pattani (BNPP): Islamic insurgent group in Malaysia and Thailand

Myanmar 
Eastern Shan State Army
Mong Tai Army (MTA): Armed drug cartel
National Democratic Alliance Army (NDAA)
United Wa State Army (UWSA): Autonomous military group in Wa State
Myanmar National Democratic Alliance Army (MNDAA): Also known as the Kokang Army, a Kokang nationalist group active in Myanmar.
Karen National Liberation Army
Kachin Independence Army: Group in North Burma which occupies most of Kachin State.
 Shan State Army - North
 Shan State Army - South

Pakistan 
Balochistan Liberation Army (BLA): Separatist group

Philippines 
 Abu Sayyaf Group (ASG): Islamic separatist group in the southern Philippines. Also known as Al Harakut Al Islamiyya.
 Alex Boncayao Brigade (ABB): Urban militant group of the Communist Party of the Philippines
 Bagani: A counter insurgency group operating in Cabanglasan.
Ilaga (1971-1979): Christian extremist paramilitary group in the Southern Philippines. They battled against the Moro National Liberation Front and Moro Islamic Liberation Front. 
Alamara: A counterinsurgency operating across the central-eastern side of Mindanao

Sri Lanka 
Eelam People’s Democratic Party

Thailand 

 Barasi Revolusi Nasional (BRN): National separatist group in Malaysia and Thailand
 Barisan National Pember-Basan Pattani (BNPP): Islamic insurgent group in Malaysia and Thailand

Europe

Albania 
Albanian National Army

Bosnia and Herzegovina 

Green Berets
Serbian Honour. A Russian-trained and -funded paramilitary unit acting in support of separatist leader Milorad Dodik.

Croatia 

Ustaše Militia acted as a para-military unit, an auxiliary part of the WW2 Croatian Nazi Puppet State's Armed Forces

Georgia 

Algeti Wolves: Georgian group which carried out anti-Russian attacks in the 1990s.

Ireland 

Óglaigh na hÉireann (OnH) (2006–09): Small dissident Irish republican group, split from the Continuity IRA.
 Óglaigh na hÉireann (OnH) (2009–): Dissident Irish republican group, split from the Real IRA due to differences in leadership and factionalism.

Poland 
Strzelec Riflemen's Association of Poland

Russia 
Russian Orthodox Army
Interbrigades
Russian Imperial Movement
Wagner Group

Türkiye 
Grey Wolves

Ukraine 
Misanthropic Division
Ukrainian National Self Defense
Berdiansk Partisan Army
Popular Resistance of Ukraine
Atesh (movement)

United Kingdom 
There are a number of paramilitary organisations in the United Kingdom, most of them operate in and around Northern Ireland and are a continuation of the various paramilitary groups which operated in Northern Ireland during The Troubles. Apart from these, there are a small number of white supremacist paramilitary organisations which operate in the United Kingdom.
Real Irish Republican Army mainly in Northern Ireland
Ulster Defence Association (UDA): Ulster loyalist group.
Ulster Resistance mainly in Northern Ireland
Ulster Volunteer Force mainly in Northern Ireland
Combat 18
Red Hand Commando (RHC): Ulster loyalist paramilitary group, linked to the Ulster Volunteer Force
Loyalist Volunteer Force (LVF): Ulster loyalist group, split from the UVF's Mid-Ulster Brigade.
Irish National Liberation Army (INLA) (1974–): Split from the Official IRA in opposition to the OIRA's 1972 ceasefire. Mainly in Northern Ireland
Irish People's Liberation Organisation (IPLO) (1986–92): Formed by expelled and disaffected members of the INLA after that group started to reduce operations in the mid 1980s. The group were heavily involved in drug dealing and other criminal activities and were forcibly shut down in 1992 by the Provisional IRA.
Irish Republican Liberation Army (IRLA) (2006–): A "self-styled vigilante group" that split from the Continuity IRA. Linked to the Loyalist Volunteer Force according to some sources.
 The name Irish Republican Army (IRA) has been used by many Irish republican groups in the 20th and 21st centuries. The following names are commonly used by the media and security services, but each group referred to themselves solely as the Irish Republican Army (IRA), and generally rejected the legitimacy of the others.
 Irish Volunteers (1913–16) Set up to counter the Ulster Volunteers but was shut down after the Easter Rising and formed the I.R.A. (1917–22)
 Irish Republican Army (1917–22): The original IRA, which was the official defence force of the Irish Republic and fought in the Irish War of Independence.
 Irish Republican Army (1922–69): The anti-treaty continuation of the original IRA, active during the Irish Civil War, Irish sabotage campaign, Northern Campaign, Irish Border Campaign and the Troubles.
 Official IRA (OIRA) (1969–72): The Official IRA was formed after a split in 1969 between different factions of the 1922 IRA. The OIRA became a more overtly political movement, advocating Marxist–Leninist principles.
 Provisional IRA (PIRA) (1969–2005): Also known as the Provos, the Provisional IRA was the more militarily active of the two IRAs created out of the 1969 split.
 Continuity IRA (CIRA) (1986–): Split from the Provisional IRA when that group dropped its policy of abstentionism in relation to Dáil Éireann.
 Real IRA (RIRA) (1997–): Known in the media as the New IRA since their 2012 merger with Republican Action Against Drugs and other smaller republican militant groups, they split from the Provisional IRA over that group's support for the Irish peace process and the Good Friday Agreement.

Yugoslavia 
 SDG, otherwise known as the Serbian Volunteer Guard or Arkan's Tigers. This was a paramilitary army of Serbian Nationalists under the command of Zeljko Raznatovic, active during the Yugoslav Wars.

Middle East

Lebanon
Hezbollah

Palestine
The Palestinian Islamic Jihad and Al-Aqsa Martyrs Brigade of Fatah
The Izz ad-Din al-Qassam Brigades of Hamas

Multinational 
Nordic Strength
Sea Org: Scientology group with roots in naval tradition. Dress in uniforms, live communally in barracks, and are organized around naval ranks. Some dispute whether it is paramilitary.

See also
List of defunct paramilitary organizations
List of police tactical units
List of private military contractors
List of private security companies
List of countries by number of military and paramilitary personnel
Militia
Military volunteer
Mercenary
List of designated terrorist groups
Violent non-state actor
Private army

Footnotes

References
 
 
 
 

 
paramilitary